The Kitsap Peninsula lies west of Seattle across Puget Sound, in Washington state in the Pacific Northwest. Hood Canal separates the peninsula from the Olympic Peninsula on its west side. The peninsula, a.k.a. "Kitsap", encompasses all of Kitsap County except Bainbridge and Blake Islands, as well as the northeastern part of Mason County and the northwestern part of Pierce County. The highest point on the Kitsap Peninsula is Gold Mountain. The U.S. Navy's Puget Sound Naval Shipyard, and Naval Base Kitsap (comprising the former NSB Bangor and NS Bremerton) are on the peninsula. Its main city is Bremerton.

Though earlier referred to as the Great Peninsula or Indian Peninsula, with "Great Peninsula" still its official name, its current name comes from Kitsap County, which occupies most of the peninsula. It is thus the namesake of Chief Kitsap, an 18th- and 19th-century warrior and medicine man of the Suquamish Tribe. The Suquamish were one of the historical fishing tribes belonging to the Coast Salish group of peoples, and their ancestral grounds were based on the eastern shores of the Kitsap Peninsula. Seattle is named after the tribe's most famous leader, Chief Seattle. The Port Madison Indian Reservation, located between Poulsbo and Agate Pass, is the modern Suquamish tribal center. The Kitsap Peninsula is also home to the Port Gamble S'Klallam Tribe, another branch of the Coast Salish people, whose tribal center is the Port Gamble S'Klallam Indian Reservation at Little Boston located on the northwest coast of the peninsula. And though their main center now is at Skokomish the Hood Canal was the main demesne of the communities of the Twana, another subgroup of the Coast Salish.

The peninsula is connected to the eastern shore of Puget Sound by Washington State Ferries, which run from Bremerton to Downtown Seattle, from Kingston to Edmonds and from Southworth to West Seattle via Vashon Island, by the Tacoma Narrows Bridge from Point Fosdick to Tacoma, and to the northeastern shore of the main Olympic Peninsula by the Hood Canal Bridge.

Cities and towns

 Annapolis
 Bangor
 Belfair
 Bremerton
 Brownsville
 Colby
 Colchester
 Chico
 East Port Orchard
 Erlands Point
 Gig Harbor
 Gorst
 Hansville
 Illahee
 Indianola
 Keyport
 Kingston
 Kitsap Lake
 Manchester
 Navy Yard City
 Olalla
 Parkwood
 Port Gamble
 Port Orchard
 Poulsbo
 Purdy
 Retsil
 Seabeck
 Silverdale
 Southworth
 Suquamish
 Tahuya
 Tracyton

Bays and inlets

 Agate Pass
 Anderson Cove
 Appletree Cove
 Big Beef Harbor
 Burke Bay
 Burley Lagoon
 Carr Inlet
 Case Inlet
 Chico Bay
 Clam Bay
 Colvos Passage
 Coon Bay
 Dogfish Bay
 Dyes Inlet
 Hood Canal
 Horsehead Bay
 Liberty Bay
 Little Beef Harbor
 Little Clam Bay
 Miller Bay
 Mud Bay
 Nesika Bay
 Olalla Bay
 Orrs Cove
 Ostrich Bay
 Oyster Bay
 Phinney Bay
 Pilots Cove
 Port Gamble
 Port Madison
 Port Orchard
 Port Washington Narrows
 Races Cove
 Rich Passage
 Seabeck Bay
 Sinclair Inlet
 Skunk Bay
 Stavis Bay
 Stiles Lagoon
 Tacoma Narrows
 Yukon Harbor

Headlands

 Anderson Point
 Apple Cove Point
 Bass Point
 Command Point
 Elwood Point
 Erlands Point
 Foulweather Bluff
 Hood Point
 King Spit
 Lemolo Point
 Madrona Point
 Manette Peninsula
 Middle Point
 Norwegian Point
 Orchard Point
 Pearson Point
 Pilot Point
 Point Bolin
 Point Glover
 Point Herron
 Point Jefferson
 Point Julia
 Point Misery
 Point No Point
 Point Southworth
 Point Turner
 President Point
 Rocky Point
 Ross Point
 Ruby Point
 Salisbury Point
 Sandy Hook
 Teekalet Bluff
 Tekiu Point
 Twin Spits
 University Point
 Virginia Point
 Waterman Point
 Windy Point, Puget Sound

References

External links
 
 Kitsap Peninsula Visitor Information

Landforms of Kitsap County, Washington
Landforms of Mason County, Washington
Landforms of Pierce County, Washington
Landforms of Puget Sound
Peninsulas of Washington (state)